Helena Rubinstein (born Chaja Rubinstein; December 25, 1870 – April 1, 1965) was a Polish and American businesswoman, art collector, and philanthropist. A cosmetics entrepreneur, she was the founder and eponym of Helena Rubinstein Incorporated cosmetics company, which made her one of the world's richest women.

Early life

Rubinstein was the eldest of eight daughters born to Polish Jews, Augusta – Gitte (Gitel) Shaindel Rubinstein née Silberfeld and Horace – Naftoli Hertz Rubinstein. Her father was a shopkeeper in Kraków, Lesser Poland, which was then occupied by Austria-Hungary following the partitions of Poland in the late 18th century. The existentialist philosopher Martin Buber was her cousin. She was also the cousin of Ruth Rappaport's mother.

Move to Australia
After refusing an arranged marriage, Rubinstein emigrated from Poland to Australia in 1896, with no money and little English.  Her stylish clothes and milky complexion did not pass unnoticed among the town's ladies, however, and she soon found enthusiastic buyers for the jars of beauty cream in her luggage. She spotted a market where she began to make her own. A key ingredient of the cream, lanolin, was readily at hand.

Coleraine, in the Western Victoria region, where her uncle was a shopkeeper, might have been an "awful place" but was home to some 75 million sheep that secreted abundant quantities of lanolin. These sheep were the wealth of the nation and the Western District's vast mobs of merinos produced the finest wool in the land. To disguise the lanolin's pungent odour, Rubinstein experimented with lavender, pine bark, and water lilies.

Rubinstein had a falling out with her uncle, but after a stint as a bush governess began waitressing at the Winter Garden tearooms in Melbourne. There, she found an admirer willing to stump up the funds to launch her Crème Valaze, supposedly including herbs imported "from the Carpathian Mountains". It cost ten pence and sold for six shillings. Known to her customers only as Helena, Rubinstein could soon afford to open a salon in fashionable Collins Street, selling glamour as a science to customers whose skin was "diagnosed" and a suitable treatment "prescribed".

Sydney was next, and within five years, Australian operations were profitable enough to finance a Salon de Beauté Valaze in London. As such, Rubinstein formed one of the world's first cosmetic companies. Her business enterprise proved immensely successful and later in life, she used her enormous wealth to support charitable institutions in the fields of education, art, and health.

Rubinstein rapidly expanded her operation. In 1908, her sister Ceska assumed the Melbourne shop's operation, and with $100,000, Rubinstein moved to London and began what was to become an international enterprise. (Women at this time could not obtain bank loans, so the money was her own.)

Marriage and children – London and Paris
In 1908, she married the Polish-born American journalist Edward William Titus in London.  They had two sons, Roy Valentine Titus (London, December 12, 1909 – New York, June 18, 1989) and Horace Titus (London, April 23, 1912 – New York, May 18, 1958).  They eventually moved to Paris where she opened a salon in 1912.  Her husband helped with writing the publicity and set up a small publishing house, published Lady Chatterley's Lover and hired Samuel Putnam to translate famous model Kiki's memoirs.

Rubinstein threw lavish dinner parties and became known for apocryphal quips, such as when an intoxicated French ambassador expressed vitriol toward Edith Sitwell and her brother Sacheverell: "Vos ancêtres ont brûlé Jeanne d'Arc!" Rubinstein, who knew little French, asked a guest what the ambassador had said. "He said, 'Your ancestors burned Joan of Arc.'"  Rubinstein replied, "Well, someone had to do it."

At another fête, Marcel Proust asked her what makeup a duchess might wear.  She summarily dismissed him because "he smelt of mothballs." Rubinstein recollected later, "How was I to know he was going to be famous?"

Move to the United States

At the outbreak of World War I, she and Titus moved to New York City, where she opened a cosmetics salon in 1915, the forerunner of a chain throughout the country. Helena opened up the boundless American market, and she skillfully used it, despite serious competitors. This was the beginning of her vicious rivalry with another notable woman of the cosmetics industry, Elizabeth Arden. Both Rubinstein and Arden, who died within 18 months of each other, were social climbers. They were both keenly aware of effective marketing and luxurious packaging, the attraction of beauticians in neat uniforms, the value of celebrity endorsements, the perceived value of overpricing and the promotion of the pseudoscience of skincare. The rivalry with Arden lasted all her life. Rubinstein said of her rival, "With her packaging and my product, we could have ruled the world."

From 1917, Rubinstein took on the manufacturing and wholesale distribution of her products. The "Day of Beauty" in the various salons became a great success. The purported portrait of Rubinstein in her advertising was of a middle-age mannequin with a Gentile appearance.

In 1928, she sold the American business to Lehman Brothers for $7.3 million, ($127 million in 2022). After the onset of the Great Depression, she bought back the nearly worthless stock for less than $1 million and eventually increased the value of the company to $100 million, establishing salons and outlets in almost a dozen US cities. This saga, and Rubinstein's early business career, has been the subject of a recent Harvard Business School case. Her subsequent spa at 715 Fifth Avenue included a restaurant, a gymnasium and rugs by painter Joan Miró. She commissioned artist Salvador Dalí to design a powder compact as well a portrait of herself.

Divorce and remarriage
After her divorce, in 1938 Helena readily married Prince Artchil Gourielli-Tchkonia (sometimes spelled Courielli-Tchkonia; born in Georgia, February 18, 1895, died in New York City November 21, 1955), whose somewhat clouded matrilinear claim to Georgian nobility stemmed from him having been born a member of the untitled noble Tchkonia family of Guria, enticing the ambitious young man to appropriate the genuine title of his grandmother, born Princess Gourielli.

Gourielli-Tchkonia was 23 years younger than Rubinstein.  Eager for a regal title, Rubinstein pursued the handsome man avidly, coming to name a male cosmetics line after her youthful prized catch.  Some have claimed that the marriage was a marketing ploy, including Rubinstein's being able to pass herself off as Helena Princess Gourielli.

Rubinstein took a packed lunch to work and was frugal in many matters, but bought top-fashion clothing and valuable fine art and furniture. She founded the Helena Rubinstein Pavilion of Contemporary Art in Tel Aviv and in 1957 she established the Helena Rubinstein travelling art scholarship in Australia. In 1953, she established the philanthropic Helena Rubinstein Foundation to provide funds to organizations specializing in health, medical research and rehabilitation as well as to the America-Israel Cultural Foundation and scholarships to Israelis.

In 1959, Rubinstein represented the US cosmetics industry at the American National Exhibition in Moscow.

Called "Madame" by her employees, she eschewed idle chatter, continued to be active in the corporation throughout her life, even from her sick bed, and staffed the company with her relatives.

Death and legacy
Rubinstein died April 1, 1965, of natural causes and was buried in Mount Olivet Cemetery in Queens. Some of her estate, including African and fine art, Lucite furniture, and overwrought Victorian furniture upholstered in purple, was auctioned in 1966 at the Parke-Bernet Galleries in New York City.

One of Rubinstein's numerous sayings was: "There are no ugly women, only lazy ones." A scholarly study of her exclusive beauty salons and how they blurred and influenced the conceptual boundaries at the time among fashion, art galleries, the domestic interior and versions of modernism is explored by Marie J. Clifford (Winterthur Portfolio, vol. 38). A feature-length documentary film, The Powder and the Glory (2009) by Ann Carol Grossman and Arnie Reisman, details the rivalry between Rubinstein and Elizabeth Arden.

In her book 'Ugly Beauty' Ruth Brandon described her methodology:

She was "the first self-made female millionaire, an accomplishment she owed primarily to publicity savvy. She knew how to advertise—using 'fear copy with a bit of blah-blah'— and introduced the concept of 'problem' skin types.  She also pioneered the use of pseudo-science in marketing, donning a lab coat in many advertisements, despite the fact that her only training had been a two-month tour of European skin-care facilities.  She knew how to manipulate consumers' status anxiety, as well: If a product faltered initially, she would hike the price to raise the perceived value."

In 1973, the company Helena Rubinstein, Inc. was sold to Colgate-Palmolive, and is now owned by L'Oréal.  The L'Oreal takeover was to cause a good deal of scandal as company founder, Eugene Schueller, had been an enthusiastic collaborator during the war, and in its aftermath, L'Oreal became notorious for employing ex-Nazis on the run. Jacques Correze, who engineered the takeover, was one of these: he had been active in expropriating Jewish property in Paris.

She was mentioned by the Austropop/comedy band Erste Allgemeine Verunsicherung in their debut album in 1978, in the song "Pustel Gunkel".

The Helena Rubinstein portrait prize, also known as "Boans – Helena Rubinstein portrait prize", was an annual prize of £300 for portraiture by an Australian artist, awarded by the Helena Rubinstein Foundation (disbanded 2011), and mostly staged at the Claude Hotchin Gallery in Western Australia.

The L'Oréal-UNESCO Awards for Women in Science are also known as the Helena Rubinstein Women in Science Awards.

The Helena Rubinstein Foundation, which had been established in 1953, operated through 2011, ultimately distributing nearly $130 million over the course of six decades, primarily to education, arts, and community-based organizations in New York City. The foundation was a longtime supporter of children's programming for New York City's PBS affiliate WNET.

The Manhattan Jewish Museum hosted the exhibition "Helena Rubinstein: Beauty Is Power", the first museum show devoted to Rubinstein, from October 31, 2014, until March 22, 2015.

Support for the arts
A one-off Rubinstein Mural Prize was awarded in 1958 to Erica McGilchrist for her work in the Women's College, University of Melbourne, and a Helena Rubinstein Scholarship was awarded to Frank Hodgkinson in 1958 and Charles Blackman 1960.

A £300 annual Helena Rubinstein portrait prize was awarded for works by Australian artists. Prizewinners were  Romola Clifton in 1960; William Boissevain 1961; Margaret Olley 1962; Vladas Meskenas 1963; Judy Cassab 1964 and 1965; Jack Carington Smith 1966.

In popular culture
The musical War Paint dramatizes her rivalry with competitor Elizabeth Arden. After a run Chicago's Goodman Theater, the show opened on Broadway at the Nederlander Theatre on April 6, 2017, earning four Tony Award nominations, including Best Actress in a Leading Role for Patti LuPone's portrayal of Rubinstein as well as for Christine Ebersole in the same category for her role as rival, Arden.

The comedy Lip Service by the Australian dramatist John Misto chronicles the life and career of Rubinstein and her rivalry with Elizabeth Arden and Revlon. Lip Service premiered April 26, 2017, at the Park Theatre in London, under the title Madame Rubinstein, before opening at Sydney's Ensemble Theatre in August of the same year.

See also
History of cosmetics

References

Further reading
 Alpern, Sara. "Helena Rubinstein", Jewish Women: A Comprehensive Historical Encyclopedia, Jewish Publishing Society, 2007 
 Brandon, Ruth. "Ugly Beauty: Helena Rubinstein, L'Oreal, and the Blemished History of Looking Good", Harpercollins, New York, 2011 
 Brody, Seymour (author), Art Seiden (illustrator) (1956). Jewish Heroes & Heroines of America: 150 True Stories of American Jewish Heroism, Hollywood, Florida: Lifetime Books, 1996 
 Clifford, Marie J. (2003). "Helena Rubinstein's Beauty Salons, Fashion, and Modernist Display", Winterthur Portfolio, vol. 38, pp. 83–108)
 Fitoussi, Michèle. (2012) Helena Rubinstein: the woman who invented beauty HarperCollins Publishers, Sydney South, N.S.W. 
 Woodhead, Lindy. (2004). War Paint, London: Virago Press

External links

 Helena Rubinstein cosmetics

 Jewish Virtual Library: Helena Rubinstein biography
 

1870 births
1965 deaths
Polish emigrants to the United States
American cosmetics businesspeople
American make-up artists
American retail chief executives
American women chief executives
Businesspeople from Melbourne
Businesspeople from New York City
Polish emigrants to Australia
History of cosmetics
Jewish American art collectors
Jewish American philanthropists
Jews from Galicia (Eastern Europe)
L'Oréal people
Perfumers
Skin care
American women company founders
American company founders
Women art collectors
Philanthropists from New York (state)
Burials at Mount Olivet Cemetery (Queens)